Karl Friedrich Henckell (17 April 1864, Hanover – 30 July 1929, Lindau) was a German author,  poet, and publisher.

Henckell studied at the universities of Berlin, Heidelberg, Munich, and Zurich. He lived abroad, in Switzerland, in Zurich and much later Muri (Bern), in Italy (Milan), and in Belgium (Brussels), and was well acquainted with the modern literatures of Europe, on which he frequently lectured, besides giving readings from his own poems. From 1896 until 1905 he was his own publisher, as well as the publisher of other literature, in Zurich and Leipzig. He settled in Munich in 1908. His poetry is revolutionary and socialistic in its tendency.

The composer Richard Strauss set nine of Henckell's poems to music, the first one in 1894, "" (Rest, my soul).

Works
  (1884)
  (1887)
 Diorama (1889); a collected edition in 1898
  (1904)
  (1906)
  (1907)
  (1911)

References

External links

Karl Henckell website maintained in German by Monsalvat Verlags, Zurich
 

1864 births
1929 deaths
German poets
German publishers (people)
Writers from Hanover
People from the Province of Hanover
Humboldt University of Berlin alumni
University of Zurich alumni
Heidelberg University alumni
Ludwig Maximilian University of Munich alumni
German male poets
German-language poets